Edmund Breres (1580 - 1625) was an English politician who sat in the House of Commons in 1624.

Breres was the son of  Alexander Breres of Chorley or Preston in Amunderness. He was admitted at Gray's Inn on 25 November 1602. In 1624, he was elected Member of Parliament for Newton for the Happy Parliament.  
 
Breres married a daughter of Thomas Tyldesley, of Tyldesley, the Attorney-General of Lancashire.

References

1580 births
1625 deaths
English MPs 1624–1625
Members of Gray's Inn